Elisabeth Xavier Miessa (born 25 January 1961) is a Brazilian actress, singer and playwright.

Biography 

Her first appearance on television was in teleteatro Alô, Alguém aí?, William Saroyan, aired by TV Cultura in 1975. She debuted as an actress in the soap opera Papai Coração in 1976 TV Tupi.

In 1983, she studied singing with Pepê Castro Neves and lyrical singing and reading music, with Luis Carlos Brito. Two years later, she studied art with Peter Brook.

In 1989, with Kika Sampaio she studied tap dance with Ruth Rachou and Val Folly and lyrical singing with Marga Nicolau.

In 1983, Beth married musician Nando Carneiro, who had a son. Separated in 1988, Beth was also involved with director Gerald Thomas, who staged the play Elektra Com Creta in 1986.

The actress is Kardecist since childhood, religion conveyed by a parent.

Career

Television

Film

Theater 
 1986 - Elektra com Creta
 2009-2010 - Simplesmente Eu, Clarice Lispector

References

External links 

1961 births
Living people
Actresses from Rio de Janeiro (city)
Brazilian telenovela actresses
Brazilian film actresses
Brazilian stage actresses
Brazilian spiritualists
20th-century Brazilian actresses
21st-century Brazilian actresses